The Woodward Homestead is a historic house at 17 Main Street in Wakefield, Massachusetts, USA.  It is an unusual style wood-frame house, with an older portion (the north side) that is 1.5 stories and was probably built sometime before 1765.  It was remodeled later in the 19th century in the Federal style, and in the 1830s the southern portion of the house was added, with Greek Revival style (although the northern section retained its Federal character).  The first known occupant was John Woodward in 1765; he was from a family that arrived in the area late in the 17th century.

The house was listed on the National Register of Historic Places in 1989.

See also
National Register of Historic Places listings in Wakefield, Massachusetts
National Register of Historic Places listings in Middlesex County, Massachusetts

References

Houses on the National Register of Historic Places in Wakefield, Massachusetts
Federal architecture in Massachusetts
Houses in Wakefield, Massachusetts